This list of Russian saints includes the saints canonized by the Russian Orthodox Church and the Russian saints canonized by other Eastern Orthodox Churches.

Saints are sorted by their first names.

See also the category :Category:Russian saints.

A more complete list of saints:

List of Russian saints (until 15th century)
List of Russian saints (since 15th century)

Alphabetical list


A
 Abraham and Coprius of Gryazovets (XV century), founders of the monastery in Gryazovets
 Abraham and Onesimus of Kiev Caves, 12th- and 13th-century monks from the Kiev Pechersk Lavra
 Abraham of Bulgaria (d. 1229), Muslim-born convert from Volga Bulgaria, killed for his conversion, martyr
 Abraham of Galich, hegumen, founder of four monasteries on Lake Chukhloma in Kostroma Oblast
 Abraham of Mirozha, a 12th-century abbot of the Mirozhsky Monastery at Pskov
 Abraham of Rostov, founder of the Abraham Epiphany Monastery in Rostov
 Abraham of Smolensk, 12th-century monk and icon-painter, justified by a miracle and acquitted against the charges leveled against him
 Adrian of Poshekhonye, monk and iconographer, the founder and first hegumen of the Dormition Monastery in Poshekhonye
 Agapetus of the Kiev Caves, 11th-century monk and doctor from the Kiev Pechersk Lavra, who healed Prince Vladimir Monomach
 Alexander Hotovitzky, Orthodox missionary in the United States, martyr executed by Bolsheviks
 Alexander Nevsky, Prince of Novgorod and Grand Prince of Vladimir, military hero famous for the Battle of Neva and the Battle of the Ice, patron saint and considered by a poll to be the greatest person in Russian history
 Alexander Schmorell, martyr, one of White Rose founders, he was active against Germany's Nazi regime.
 Alexander Svirsky, monk in the Valaam Monastery and the founder of Alexander-Svirsky Monastery
 Alexis of Wilkes-Barre, a missionary in the American Midwest who converted approximately 20,000 Eastern Rite Catholics to the Russian Orthodox Church
 Alexius, Metropolitan of Moscow, Metropolitan of Kiev, Moscow and all Russia, regent during Prince Dmitry Donskoy's minority, spiritual tutor of Dmitry Donskoy and Vladimir the Bold, saved the country from a Tatar raid by miraculous curing of Taydulla, wife of Khan Jani Beg the Golden Horde
 Alypius of the Caves, 11th-century monk from the Kiev Pechersk Lavra, one of the first Russian icon painters
 Ambrose of Optina, starets of the Optina Monastery, founder of the Shamordino Convent
 Ambrosius Gudko, bishop of Sarapul and Yelabuga before the Russian Revolution of 1917
 Andrew Rublev, most famous Russian icon-painter, author of the Trinity
 Andronic Nikolsky, archbishop of Perm, hieromartyr killed during the Russian Revolution of 1917
 Anna of Kashin, medieval princess, wife of Mikhail of Tver, was twice canonized as a holy protectress of women who suffer the loss of relatives, having lost all her relatives due to wars with the Golden Horde
 Anthony, John, and Eustathios, martyrs executed by pagan Lithuanian Grand Duke Algirdas
 Anthony of Kiev, co-founder of the Kiev Pechersk Lavra, the first monastery in Russia
 Anthony of Siya, founder of the Antonievo-Siysky Monastery
 Arsenius Matseyevich, archbishop of Rostov who protested against the confiscation of the church's land by Empress Catherine II in 1764, was deprived of his office and imprisoned in a fortress until his death
 Artemius of Verkola, 16th-century child saint whose body showed no sign of decay
 Athanasius of Brest-Litovsk, martyr killed by Catholics for opposition to the Union of Brest in the Polish–Lithuanian Commonwealth
 Athanasius Sakharov, bishop of Kovrov, leader of Catacomb Church, who join to the Russian Orthodox Church in 1945

B
 Barbara Yakovleva, nun and sister of mercy in the convent of Grand Duchess Elizabeth Fyodorovna, killed by the Bolsheviks along with several Romanov Princes
 Barlaam of Chikoy, 19th-century missionary in Transbaikal
 Barlaam of Kiev, the first abbot of the Kiev Pechersk Lavra
 Barlaam of Khutyn, founder of the Khutyn Monastery in Novgorod Republic
 Barsanuphius of Optina, archimandrite, starets of Optina Pustyn
 Basil the Blessed, fool for Christ who gave his name to St. Basil's Cathedral on the Red Square (actually the correct name is the Cathedral of the Intercession or Pokrovsky Sobor)
 Basil Kalika, 14th-century icon-painter and Archbishop of Novgorod who was elected by the veche and reinvigorated the office
 Basil of Pavlovsky Posad, mid-19th-century factory worker who turned multiple Old Believers into Russian Orthodoxy
 Benjamin of Petrograd, metropolitan of Petrograd
 Boris and Gleb, children of Vladimir the Great, the first saints canonized in Kievan Rus'

C
 Charitina of Lithuania, noblewoman from the pagan Grand Duchy of Lithuania who became a nun in Novgorod
 Constantine of Murom, 11th-century Prince of Murom who baptized Muromian pagans
 Cyprian, Metropolitan of Moscow, Metropolitan of Moscow and all Russia who united the churches of the Grand Duchy of Moscow and Grand Duchy of Lithuania for a period
 Cyrill of Turov, bishop of Turov, one of the first and finest theologians and writers of Kievan Rus'

D
 Daniel of Moscow, the first Grand Prince of Moscow, founder of the first Moscow monasteries (Epiphany Monastery and Danilov Monastery)
 Daumantas of Pskov, ruler of Pskov who made the city independent from Novgorod Republic, defender of Russia from the Livonian Order
 Demetrius Donskoy, war hero, the first Prince of Moscow to openly challenge Mongol authority in Russia, famous for the Battle of Kulikovo
 Demetrius of Rostov, a leading opponent of the Caesaropapist reform of the Russian Orthodox church promoted by Theofan Prokopovich and Peter I, major religious writer
 Demetrius of Uglich, son of Ivan the Terrible, mysteriously died or killed, later impersonated by the impostors False Dmitry I and False Dmitry II during the Time of Troubles

E
 Grand Duchess Elizabeth Feodorovna, senior sister of the last Russian Empress Alexandra Feodorovna, became a prominent nun after her husband was murdered by revolutionary terrorists, founded the Marfo-Mariinsky Convent
 Ephraim of Pereyaslavl, Metropolitan of Kiev and All-Rus' in the late 11th century
 Epiphanius the Wise, a monk from Rostov, disciple of Saint Sergius of Radonezh, hagiographer of Saint Sergius and Saint Stephen of Perm
 Eudoxia of Moscow, wife of Dmitry Donskoy, healer, founded the Ascension Monastery and the Church of the Nativity of the Theotokos, the oldest surviving building in Moscow
 Euphrosyne of Polatsk, granddaughter of a prince of Polotsk, Vseslav, owner of Cross of Saint Euphrosyne
 Euphrosynus of Pskov, 15th-century monk from Snetogorsky Monastery who founded a monastic community near Pskov
 Euthymius II of Novgorod, Archbishop of Novgorod in the 15th century, major patron of arts

F
 Feodor Kuzmich, starets who according to a legend was in fact Alexander I of Russia who faked his death to become a hermit
 Fyodor Ushakov, the most illustrious Russian admiral of the 18th century, did not lose a single ship in 43 battles

G
 Gabriel of Belostok, 17th-century child saint
 Gennadius of Novgorod, compiled the first complete codex of the Bible in Slavic, the Gennady Bible
 German of Kazan and Svyazhsk, was second bishop of Kazan

H
 Herman of Alaska, one of the first Eastern Orthodox missionaries to the New World, patron saint of the Americas
 Herman of Solovki, one of the founders of the Solovetsky Monastery
 Herman of Valaam, preached Christianity to Karelians and Finns, co-founder of the Valaam Monastery
 Hermogenes Dolganyov, hieromartyr, Bishop of Tobolsk and Siberia, killed during the Russian Revolution
 Hilarion of Kiev, the first non-Greek Metropolitan of Kiev, the author of the Sermon on Law and Grace, one of the earliest Slavonic texts known
 Hilarion Troitsky, archbishop of Vereya, one of the greatest Russian theologians of the early 20th century

I
 Igor II of Kiev, Grand Prince of Kiev turned monk, martyr
 Prince Igor Constantinovich of Russia, a member of the Romanov family, killed by Bolsheviks
 Ilia Muromets, a medieval warrior, and in later life a monk of Kiev Pechersk Lavra.
 Ignatius Bryanchaninov, bishop of Caucassus, major 19th-century spiritual writer
 Innocent of Alaska, a missionary to Alaska and Metropolitan of Moscow.
 Innocent of Irkutsk, a missionary to Siberia and the first bishop of Irkutsk
 Ioakim Korsunianin, the first bishop of Novgorod the Great and builder of the original wooden Saint Sophia Cathedral in Novgorod
 Irenarch of Rostov, a 16th-century hermit of Rostov, mystic and visionary, a companion of John the Hairy
 Isaiah of Rostov, 11th-century missionary, the second bishop of Rostov

J

 Jacob Netsvetov, a Russian native of the Aleutian Islands who became a priest and missionary among Alaskan peoples
 Joasaph of Belgorod, an 18th-century bishop of Belgorod, canonized in 1911 for the miraculous cures attributed to his relics
 Job of Maniava, defender of Russian Orthodoxy in Ukraine, the founder of Maniava Skit
 Job of Pochayiv, defender of Russian Orthodoxy in Ukraine, a prominent hegumen and builder of Pochayiv Lavra
 John the Hairy, 16th-century yurodivy (fool-for-Christ), a companion of Irenarch of Rostov
 John Kochurov, early 20th-century Orthodox missionary to the United States, later hieromartyr killed by Bolsheviks during the October Revolution
 John of Kronstadt, patron saint of St Petersburg, mystic and religious writer
 John of Moscow, fool-for-Christ and wonderworker of Moscow during the reign of Boris Godunov
 John of Novgorod, highly venerated 12th-century Archbishop of Novgorod
 John of Pskov, a hermit living in Pskov at the turn of the 16th to 17th century
 John the Russian, one of the most renowned saints in the Greek Orthodox Church, 18th-century Russian prisoner of war in the Ottoman Empire, wonderworker respected even by Muslims
 John of Shanghai and San Francisco, wonderworker, archbishop and most known missionary of Russian Orthodox Church Outside of Russia
 John of Tobolsk, founder of Chernigov Collegium, missionary in Siberia and metropolitan bishop of Tobolsk
 Jonah of Manchuria, diocesan bishop of the Russian Orthodox Church Outside Russia who served in Northern China in the years immediately following the Bolshevik Revolution
 Jonah of Moscow, the first independent Metropolitan of Moscow and all Russia appointed without the approval of the Patriarch of Constantinople
 Joseph Volotsky, prominent caesaropapist ideologist, founder of Joseph-Volokolamsk Monastery
 Juliana of Lazarevo, 16th-century saint, famous for helping poor and needy people, a hero of the book written by her son
 Juvenaly of Alaska, Protomartyr of America, a member of the first group of Orthodox missionaries to Alaska killed by Yupik natives

K
 Kirill of Beloozero, founder of Kirillo-Belozersky Monastery
 Kuksha of the Kiev Caves, a 12th-century monk and martyr from the Kiev Pechersk Lavra, killed while spreading Christianity among pagan Vyatichi
 Kuksha of Odessa, 20th-century saint in the Soviet Union

L
 Luke Wojno-Jasieniecki, archbishop of Crimea, outstanding surgeon, the founder of purulent surgery, spiritual writer
 Luke Zhidiata, the first Russian-born bishop of the Russian church (all previous ones had been Greek)

M
 Macarius of Unzha, founder of several monasteries, including the Makaryev Monastery
 Maria Skobtsova, noblewoman, poet, nun, and member of the French Resistance during World War II (canonized by the Ecumenical Patriarchate)
 Mark of the Caves, a famous cave-digger in the Kiev Pechersk Monastery
 Maxim Sandovich, protomartyr of the Lemko people, an Orthodox priest was executed by the Austro-Hungarian Empire as a russophile
 Maximus the Greek, 16th-century scholar, humanist and translator
 Michael of Chernigov, powerful Kievan prince killed by Mongol-Tatars for his adherence to the Christian faith
 Michael of Kiev, first metropolitan of Kiev after Baptism of Rus
 Michael of Klop, 15th-century fool-for-Christ and wonderworker
 Michael of Tver, Grand Prince of Vladimir killed by Mongol-Tatars
 Mitrophan of Voronezh was the first bishop of Voronezh
 Moses the Hungarian, 11th-century monk in the Kiev Cave Monastery, who spent 7 years as Polish prisoner after the 1018 Kiev Expedition
 Matrona of Anemnyasevo, 20th-century saint 
 Matrona of Moscow, 20th-century saint, which claims that, from early childhood, she had the gift of prophecy, spiritual vision, and healing

N
 Nicetas of Novgorod, an 11th-century monk from the Kiev Pechersk Lavra who became wonderworker and bishop of Novgorod
 Nicetas Stylites, 12th-century hermit and healer who bound himself in chains and enclosed himself within a pillar, thus the title 'stylites'
 Nicholas Salos of Pskov, 16th-century fool-for-Christ who reprimanded Tsar Ivan the Terrible and saved the city of Pskov from Tsar's atrocity
 Nestor the Chronicler, author of the Primary Chronicle (the earliest East Slavic chronicle) and several hagiographies
 Nicholas II of Russia, the last Russian Emperor, killed during the Russian Civil War with all his family; recently the whole family were beatified as new-martyrs
 Nicholas of Japan, archbishop an translator, who introduced the Eastern Orthodox Church to Japan
 Nikon the Dry, 11th-century monk from the Kiev Pechersk Lavra, captured and enslaved by nomads and released by miracle
 Nilus of Sora, founder of Non-possessors movement

O
 Olga of Kiev, the first woman ruler of Rus' (regent), the first Christian among the Russian rulers
 Grand Duchess Olga Nikolaevna of Russia, the eldest daughter of Nicholas II of Russia and the oldest of Anastasia’s sisters.

P
 Paisius Velichkovsky, 18th-century monk and theologian who helped spread staretsdom or the concept of the spiritual elder to the Slavic world.
 Paisius Yaroslavov, 15th-century monk, starets and the author of the Take of the Kamenny Monastery
 Paul of Taganrog, 19th-century pilgrim and wonderworker
 Peter the Aleut, 19th-century martyr in Russian America, allegedly a baptized native of the Kodiak Island (one of the Aleutian Islands), killed by Spanish Catholics (canonized by OCA)
 Peter and Fevronia, 12th-century Prince and Princess consort of Murom, Holy Couple and wonderworkers an ideal of the family love and fidelity
 Peter Mogila, 17th-century Metropolitan of Kiev, theologician, educator and printer
 Peter Polyansky, Metropolitan of Krutitsy, locum tenens  of Russian Orthodox Church
 Procopius of Ustyug, 13th-century fool for Christ and miracle worker

R
 Raphael of Brooklyn, bishop of the Russian Orthodox Church in America and founder of the main cathedral of the Antiochian Orthodox Christian Archdiocese of North America

S
 Sabbas of Storozhi, founder of Savvino-Storozhevsky Monastery
 Sabbatius of Solovki, co-founder of the Solovetsky Monastery
 Seraphim of Sarov, mystic and patron saint of Russia, the greatest of the 19th-century startsy
 Serapion of Novgorod, Archbishop of Novgorod in the 16th century, known for his conflict with Joseph Volotsky
 Sergius of Radonezh, patron saint of Russia, spiritual and monastic reformer, founder of the Trinity Lavra of St. Sergius, blessed Dmitry Donskoy for the Battle of Kulikovo
 Sergius of Valaam, brought Christianity to Karelians and Finns, co-founder of the Valaam Monastery
 Silouan the Athonite, Russian-born Atos monk, called: "the most authentic monk of the twentieth century” by Thomas Merton
 Simon Shleyov, hieromartyr, bishop of Okhta, theologisian and the most notable apologist of edinoverie in the early 20th century
 Sophia of Suzdal, the first wife of Grand Prince of Moscow Vasily III
 Stephan of Perm, 14th-century missionary, credited with the conversion of the Komi Permyaks to Christianity and the invention of Old Permic script
 Sylvester of the River Obnora, 15th-century hermit who lived on the banks of the Obnora River

T 
 Theodore the Black, 13th-century Prince of Yaroslavl, Smolensk and Mozhaysk, who ended his life as a monk and deeply repented his alliance with Mongol invaders
 Theodore the Varangian and his son John, the first known martyrs in Rus'
 Theodosius of Kiev, co-founder of the Kiev Pechersk Lavra, the first monastery in Russia
 Theophan the Recluse, major 19th-century theologian who played an important role in translating the Philokalia from Church Slavonic into Russian
 Therapont of White Lake, founder of Ferapontov Monastery
 Tikhon of Kaluga, founder of the Dormition of the Mother of God Monastery in Kaluga
 Tikhon of Moscow, Patriarch of Moscow and all Russia, notable missionary, fighter against the so-called Living Church, first saint of the 20th century, who canonized of Russian Orthodox Church
 Tikhon of Zadonsk, bishop and spiritual writer, the most important 18th-century religious educator in Russia
 Tryphon of Pechenga, founder of the Pechenga Monastery on the Kola Peninsula

V 
 Vladimir I of Kiev "the Great", Kievan Prince who turned from pagan to saint and enacted the Christianization of Kievan Rus'
 Vsevolod of Pskov, medieval Prince and a patron saint of Pskov

X 
 Xenia of Saint Petersburg, fool for Christ, patron saint of St Petersburg who gave all her possessions to the poor and wandered for 45 years around the streets
 Xenophon of Robeika, 13th-century monk, hermit and hegumen of the Khutyn Monastery

Y 
 Yegor Chekryakovsky, priest and a starets, spiritual heir of Saint Ambrose of Optina
 Yuri II of Vladimir, Grand Prince of Vladimir during the Mongol invasion of Rus', died in the Battle of the Sit River

Z
Zosima of Solovki, one of the founders of the Solovetsky Monastery

See also
 List of Metropolitans and Patriarchs of Moscow
 List of saints
 List of American Eastern Orthodox saints
 List of saints of the Canary Islands

 
Saints
Russian
Saints
Saints
Saints